Carnal Circuit (also known as The Insatiables and Beverly Hills) is a 1969 Italian-German giallo written and directed  by Alberto De Martino.

Plot
A man hides his best friend from the criminals out to get him and suffers a violent beating. His friend gets killed, and he tries to find out why.

Cast 
Dorothy Malone as Vanessa Brighton 
Robert Hoffmann as Paolo Vittori 
Luciana Paluzzi as Mary Sullivan 
Frank Wolff as Frank Donovan 
John Ireland as Walter Salinger 
Roger Fritz as Giulio Lamberti 
Romina Power as Gloria Brighton 
Nicoletta Machiavelli as Luisa Lamberti 
Ini Assmann as Salinger's secretary 
Rosemarie Lindt as Patty  
Elena Persiani as Claire  
Rainer Basedow as Donovan's henchman 
John Karlsen as Fletcher
Rod Dana as Charlie

Production
Carnal Circuit was shot in Rome between February 12, 1968, and February 1969.

During an underwater scene the camera operator unexpectedly and without Romina Power's knowing, pulled down the bottom part of her swimsuit. For a moment you can see her bum. Afterwards, Romina's mother went to the producer Goffredo Lombardo shouting and complaining about director Alberto De Martino.

Release
In West Germany, Carnal Circuit was released on August 13, 1970.

References

External links

Giallo films
1969 films
1960s crime thriller films
1960s Italian-language films
English-language German films
English-language Italian films
Films directed by Alberto De Martino
Films scored by Bruno Nicolai
West German films
1960s Italian films